Germaine Paulson (born 15 February 1985) is an Australian former professional rugby league footballer who played for the South Sydney Rabbitohs in the 2006 and 2008 NRL seasons as a utility Back.

Background
Paulson was born in Beaudesert, Queensland and is of Indigenous descent, being a member of the Mununjali clan.

Playing career
Paulson made his first grade debut for South Sydney against the New Zealand Warriors in round 7 2006 which ended in a 46-14 loss.  South Sydney went on to finish last in 2006 claiming the wooden spoon.  

Paulson's final game in first grade was a 28-24 victory over North Queensland in round 8 2008.  

Paulson also made 24 appearances for the North Sydney Bears in the NSW Cup who were the feeder team for South Sydney at the time.

References

External links
Search for "Germaine Paulson" at rabbitohs.com.au

1985 births
Australian rugby league players
Indigenous Australian rugby league players
South Sydney Rabbitohs players
North Sydney Bears NSW Cup players
Northern Pride RLFC players
Rugby league utility players
Sportsmen from Queensland
Living people
Rugby league players from Queensland
21st-century Australian people